The 1983 British Formula Three Championship was the 33rd season of the British Formula Three Championship, starting at Silverstone on 6 March and concluding at Thruxton on 23 October after 20 races.

The season saw a head-to-head title battle between future Formula One stars Ayrton Senna and Martin Brundle - both driving Toyota-powered Ralt chassis, prepared by West Surrey Racing and Eddie Jordan Racing respectively. Senna built up a commanding advantage by winning the first nine races in succession, but a series of retirements for the Brazilian later in the year allowed Brundle to close the gap. The Brit took the points lead heading into the series finale, but Senna dominated the race to secure the title.

Senna won 12 of the 20 races in the season (60% of that year's races), a record until Jan Magnussen won 14 of the 18 races in the 1994 season (78% of that year's races). Both Senna and Brundle stepped up to F1 in 1984, joining Toleman and Tyrrell respectively.

Other notable drivers from the year included future Le Mans winner Davy Jones, BTCC star David Leslie and Senna's future Lotus teammate Johnny Dumfries. 1983 was also the final season before 'Class B' was established, offering a separate prize for those competing in older cars.

Race calendar and results

 Brundle was ineligible to score points as he was using European specification tyres. Allen Berg therefore secured maximum points at this round.

Championship Standings
Points in brackets include dropped scores – only the best 17 of 20 scores count towards the championship

 European Championship race where the British runners had to use regulation Avon rubber to be eligible for British championship points.

References

1983 in British motorsport
British Formula Three Championship seasons